Separate the Magnets is the second full-length studio album by the hardcore band Grade.

Track listing
 "Conceptualizing Theories In Motion"
 "Symptoms Of Simplifying The Simplistic"
 "The Adaptation Of Means"
 "Life Gets In The Way Of Living"
 "To Illustrate And Design Parameters"
 "The Joy Of Stupidity"
 "The Tie That Binds"

References

1998 albums
Grade (band) albums